Mcebisi Skwatsha (born 31 July 1964) is a politician and currently the Deputy Minister of Rural Development and Land Reform in South Africa, along with Candith Mashego-Dlamini. He is a former ANC secretary in the Western Cape.

See also

African Commission on Human and Peoples' Rights
Provincial governments of South Africa

References

1964 births
Living people
21st-century South African politicians
Lists of political office-holders in South Africa
Members of the National Assembly of South Africa
Politicians from the Western Cape
African National Congress politicians